Julia Komp (born 7 April 1989) is a German chef and in 2016, at age 27, became the youngest German female chef to be awarded a Michelin star.

Komp grew up in Overath, and graduated as an intern student at Schloss Lerbach under , who was awarded three Michelin stars. She trained as a cook in the restaurant Zur Tant in Cologne's Porz district, where she took a position in the TÜV Rheinland executive lounge. Before her move to Kerpen, she was sous chef in the restaurant La Poêle d’O*r in Cologne. In addition to appearances in the Westdeutscher Rundfunk Köln production Daheim + unterwegs (at Home + on the road), she has been a juror in the show  Die Küchenschlacht for 2018.

See also
List of female chefs with Michelin stars

References 

German chefs
Living people
1989 births